Hadamard may refer to:

 Jacques Hadamard (1865–1963), a French mathematician, whose name is associated with the following topics in mathematics:

Differential geometry 

 Hadamard space, a geodesically complete metric space of non-positive curvature
 Cartan-Hadamard theorem, a result on the topology of non-positively curved manifolds

Differential equations and dynamical systems 

 Hadamard's method of descent, a method of solving partial differential equations by reducing dimensions 
 Hadamard parametrix construction, a method of solving second order partial differential equations
 Hadamard's dynamical system, a type of chaotic dynamical system

Complex analysis and convexity 

 Hadamard three-lines theorem: a bound on the maximum modulus complex analytic functions defined on a strip in the complex plane;
 Hadamard three-circle theorem, a bound on the maximum modulus of complex analytic functions defined on an annulus in the complex plane; closely related  to the three-lines theorem; 
 Hadamard factorization theorem, a specific factorization of an entire function of finite order, involving its zeros and the exponential of a polynomial
 Ostrowski–Hadamard gap theorem, a result on the analytic continuation of lacunary power series
 Hermite–Hadamard inequality, bounding the integral of convex functions.

Transform calculus 

 Hadamard transform, an example of a generalized class of Fourier transforms
 Fast Walsh–Hadamard transform, an efficient algorithm to compute the Hadamard transform

Theory of matrices 

 Hadamard matrix, a square matrix whose entries are either +1 or −1 and whose rows are mutually orthogonal
 Hadamard code, a system used for signal error detection and correction based on Hadamard matrices
 Hadamard's inequality, a bound on the  determinants of matrices.

Quantum computing 

 Hadamard gate, a standard quantum gate that generalizes a coin flip.